Grant Township is an inactive township in Stone County, in the U.S. state of Missouri.

Grant Township was erected in 1870, taking its name from Ulysses S. Grant, a general in the Civil War and afterward President of the United States.

References

Townships in Missouri
Townships in Stone County, Missouri